Steven Craig Fletcher (born March 31, 1962) is a Canadian former professional ice hockey player.

Career 
Fletcher was drafted 202nd overall by the Calgary Flames in the 1980 NHL Entry Draft. He played in four NHL games with the Montreal Canadiens and Winnipeg Jets over parts of two seasons. Fletcher also played six seasons with the Fort Wayne Komets of the IHL and finished his career with the Atlanta Knights. Six years later, he played a single game out of retirement for the Komets in the 2002–03 season. Fletcher was inducted to the Komets Hall of Fame and had his number #77 jersey retired on November 17, 2007.

Career statistics

References

External links

1962 births
Living people
Anglophone Quebec people
Atlanta Knights players
Black Canadian ice hockey players
Calgary Flames draft picks
Canadian ice hockey left wingers
Fort Wayne Komets players
Halifax Citadels players
Hershey Bears players
Hull Olympiques players
Moncton Hawks players
Montreal Canadiens players
Sherbrooke Canadiens players
Ice hockey people from Montreal
Winnipeg Jets (1979–1996) players